HMS Colombo was a C-class light cruiser built for the Royal Navy during World War I.  She was part of the Carlisle sub-class of the C class. She survived both world wars to be scrapped in 1948.

Design and description
The Carlisle sub-class was identical with the preceding Ceres sub-class except that their bows were raised for better seakeeping. She carried  tons of fuel oil. The ship had a crew of about 432 officers and ratings.

The armament of the Carlisle sub-class consisted of five BL 6-inch (152 mm) Mk XII guns that were mounted on the centreline. One superfiring pair of guns was forward of the bridge, one was aft of the two funnels and the last two were in the stern, with one gun superfiring over the rearmost gun. The two QF  20-cwt anti-aircraft guns were positioned abreast of the fore funnel. The ships were equipped with eight  torpedo tubes in four twin mounts, two on each broadside.

Construction and war service
Colombo, named after the former capital city of Ceylon, now Sri Lanka, was laid down by Fairfield Shipbuilding and Engineering Company on 8 December 1917, and launched on 18 December 1918. She was commissioned too late to see action in the First World War, but went on to serve in the Second World War. In the interwar period she served in the Far East with the Eastern Fleet between June 1919 to 1926, before being reassigned to the North American and West Indies Station. The ship returned to the Eastern Fleet from July 1932 to 1935, before returning to the UK to be put into reserve.

Colombo spent the early part of the war in service with the Home Fleet, during which time she captured the German merchant ship Henning Oldendorff south-east of Iceland. She then returned to the Eastern Fleet between August 1940 and June 1942 before again returning to the UK to undergo a refit and conversion into an anti-aircraft cruiser between June 1942 and March 1943. Colombo survived the war and was sold on 22 January 1948, arriving at the yards of Cashmore, Newport on 13 May 1948 to be broken up.

Notes

Footnotes

Bibliography

External links
 HMS Colombo at Uboat.net

 

C-class cruisers
Ships built in Govan
1918 ships
World War I cruisers of the United Kingdom
World War II cruisers of the United Kingdom